Jacqueline Lois Elizabeth Edwards (born 14 April 1971 in Falmouth, Trelawny Parish) is a Bahamian long jumper, who was born in Jamaica.

Career

Edwards attended Queen's College High School in Nassau, Bahamas and graduated in 1987. She graduated from Stanford University in 1992.  At Stanford, Jackie was an All-American long and triple jumper (1992).  Edwards was also a 100, 200 and 4 x 100 relay sprinter.  Edwards holds the outdoor Stanford records for the long jump (6.70m, 1991) and the triple jump (13.22m, 1992) while together with, Rhonda Oliver, Alysia Hubbard and Chryste Gaines,  Edwards hold the Stanford 4 x 100 relay record of 45.32s (1991).

Edwards personal best jump was 6.80 metres, achieved in June 1996 in San Jose.

International competitions

External links

Profile

Notes

1971 births
Living people
Bahamian female sprinters
Bahamian female long jumpers
Bahamian female triple jumpers
Athletes (track and field) at the 1992 Summer Olympics
Athletes (track and field) at the 1996 Summer Olympics
Athletes (track and field) at the 2000 Summer Olympics
Athletes (track and field) at the 2004 Summer Olympics
Athletes (track and field) at the 2008 Summer Olympics
Athletes (track and field) at the 1995 Pan American Games
Athletes (track and field) at the 1999 Pan American Games
Athletes (track and field) at the 2003 Pan American Games
Athletes (track and field) at the 2007 Pan American Games
Athletes (track and field) at the 1994 Commonwealth Games
Athletes (track and field) at the 1998 Commonwealth Games
Athletes (track and field) at the 2002 Commonwealth Games
Athletes (track and field) at the 2006 Commonwealth Games
Olympic athletes of the Bahamas
Commonwealth Games silver medallists for the Bahamas
People from Trelawny Parish
Jamaican emigrants to the Bahamas
Sportspeople from Nassau, Bahamas
Stanford Cardinal women's track and field athletes
Commonwealth Games medallists in athletics
Pan American Games medalists in athletics (track and field)
Pan American Games silver medalists for the Bahamas
Pan American Games bronze medalists for the Bahamas
Central American and Caribbean Games silver medalists for the Bahamas
Competitors at the 1998 Central American and Caribbean Games
Central American and Caribbean Games medalists in athletics
Medalists at the 1995 Pan American Games
Medalists at the 2003 Pan American Games
Medallists at the 1998 Commonwealth Games